Ms. Adventure is an American documentary reality television series that premiered on Animal Planet on January 19, 2007. The program was hosted by Rachel Reenstra.cancelled in 2008.

External links

Rachel Reenstra's Blog

Travel Channel original programming
Animal Planet original programming
2000s American documentary television series
2000s American reality television series
2007 American television series debuts
2007 American television series endings